Christopher Münch (born June 17, 1962) is an American film director, screenwriter and producer.

Biography
Münch was born in 1962 in Pasadena, California and grew up with his mother in La Jolla, San Diego. When he was 15 years old, he directed a prize-winning documentary about the animals at the San Diego Zoo.

In 1991 he directed The Hours and Times, a fictionalised account of the relationship between John Lennon and his manager Brian Epstein. This premièred at the Toronto Festival of Festivals and won awards at the Sundance Film Festival, the Berlin International Film Festival and the Independent Spirit Awards. His 1996 film Color of a Brisk and Leaping Day won an Independent Spirit Award Someone to Watch Award and an award for Best Cinematography at the Sundance Film Festival. In 2000, Munch received the Moving Image Creative Capital Award.

Archive
The moving image collection of Christopher Münch is held at the Academy Film Archive.

Filmography
1991: The Hours and Times
1996: Color of a Brisk and Leaping Day
2001: The Sleepy Time Gal
2004: Harry + Max
2011: Letters from the Big Man
2020: The 11th Green

References

External links

1962 births
American film directors
American film producers
American male screenwriters
Living people